Fandemonium is a book by the Red Hot Chili Peppers and photographer David Mushegain and was released officially on November 18, 2014 (some fans were shipped their book a week earlier than the actual release date depending on how early they ordered the book). The book features photographs and interviews conducted by Mushegain with fans of all ages throughout the world during the band's 2011-13 I'm with You tour. Also included is a special introduction by the band's lead singer, Anthony Kiedis and comments by Flea, Chad Smith and Josh Klinghoffer on what it is like to be a dedicated fan to something.

Kiedis, Flea and Chad Smith all made appearances at the Barnes & Noble store in Los Angeles, CA on November 17, 2014 to sign copies of the books for fans. Kiedis also appeared at the Barnes & Noble in New York City on November 21, 2014 where he signed copies of the book and had a sit down conversation with David Fricke.

References 

2014 non-fiction books
Music autobiographies
Running Press books
Books of photographs
Books of interviews
Red Hot Chili Peppers